Hadi Abubakar Sirika is the current Minister for Aviation of the Federal Republic of Nigeria. He is a former Member House of Representative, and assumed the Senator of the Federal Republic of Nigeria in 2011, where he represents Katsina North Senatorial District under the platform of  Congress for Progressive Change. Sirika held the position of vice-chairman of the Millennium Development Goals (MDGs) Committee set by the Nigerian Senate.

Early life 
Hadi was born on 2 March 1964 in Dutsi Local Government area of Katsina state.

Education 
Hadi Sirika had graduated from "Petroleum Helicopters institute in USA, "Flight Safety International, USA" and "Delta Aeronautics, United States of America".

Career 
In 2003, Hadi was elected into the Federal House of Representative  and he left office in 2007. Sirika Hadi was again re-elected to represent Kastina North in the Nigerian Senate under the platform of Congress for Progressive Change (CPC) in 2011 elections. While in the senate, Hadi Sirika was the portal vice chairman; Millennium Development Goal (MDG) and a member of the senate committee on Aviation. He Also served in a number of different committees in the Nigerian Senate.

While in the senate, Hadi Sirika was the portal vice-chairman Millennium Developmemt Goal (MDG) and a member of the senate committee on Aviation. He also served in a number of different committees in the Nigerian Senate.

In the early 2015, Hadi became a member of the newly-born party APC, after a merger which brought about the All Progressive Congress (APC). Hadi announced in the same year that Muhammadu Buhari had been convinced to run for the presidential seat in the 2015 general Elections under the banner of the APC. After Muhammadu Buhari emerged winner of the 2015 Presidential elections, Hadi was appointed minister for state for aviation until 2019. He was reappointed as the Minister of Avaition by President Muhammadu Buhari after he won his second term bid.

As a former pilot, Sirika is a member of the Senate Committee on Aviation. He bares his mind, undisguised, about how not to own a private aircraft through corrupt means.  He also spoke about other issues bordering on piloting and the aviation sector, in an interview with Jamila Nuhu Musa and Augustine Aminu. He also spoke on President Jonathan’s poor grasp of his brief and on a number of topical issues.

On the other hand, Nigeria cannot make the desired progress in the committee of nations under the leadership of the ruling People's Democratic Party, a Congress for Progressive Change lawmaker, Senator Hadi Sirika, has said; while Speaking in an exclusive interview with LEADERSHIP WEEKEND, Sirika, who represents Katsina North senatorial district of Katsina State, said that the party had run out of ideas on how to move the nation forward despite leading the country in the last 13 years.
In his interview with Soni Daniel and Ruth Choji, Sirika, a pilot and long standing ally of the president of Nigeria, Muhammadu Buhari, speaks on how to enthrone credible and responsive leadership in Nigeria and how to salvage the Nigerian aviation industry.

See also
Cabinet of Nigeria

References

Nigerian politicians
Living people
1964 births
Nigerian polo players